The golden goby (Gobius auratus) is a species of goby from the family Gobiidae endemic to the Mediterranean Sea. This species can reach a length of  TL. It can also be found in the aquarium trade. Gobius xanthocephalus is the name that is applied to the populations of similar gobies in the eastern Atlantic and western Mediterranean which were previously considered to be  G. auratus.

References

golden goby
Fauna of the Canary Islands
Fish of the Mediterranean Sea
golden goby